The Inheritors are a supervillain group which appears in American comic books published by Marvel Comics. The family of Morlun, they typically are enemies of Spider-Man and the iterations of him.

Publication history
The Inheritors, who made their first appearance in The Superior Spider-Man #33 as part of the "Spider-Verse" storyline, were created by Christos Gage and M. A. Sepulveda, based on the Ancients, an earlier version of Morlun's family introduced in the 2006 novel Spider-Man: The Darkest Hours, written by Jim Butcher. "Spider-Geddon" again depicts the Inheritors; Gage said, "They’re terrific villains – they literally eat spider-people! They’re like vampires who feed on their life forces. And now that they're back, they have a score to settle. They’re trying to recapture their former power and glory, and God help anyone who gets in the way."

Fictional history
The Inheritors are a clan of totem hunters from Earth-001 who feed from animal, human and deity totems. They capture spider deity Master Weaver on Earth-000 at the cost of the life of their matriarch because Karn hesitated to strike. Patriarch Solus orders Karn to wear a mask and exiles him until he can earn his way back. They use the Master Weaver's power to conquer Earth-001, traveling between dimensions and hunting Spider-Totem avatars because those were prophesied to overthrow them.

Spider-Verse
Superior Spider-Man (Doctor Octopus's mind in Spider-Man's body) finds Karn as his new team (Spider-Man Noir, Six Arm Spider-Man, Spider-Monkey, Spider-Bitch and Assassin Spider-Man) ambushes him on the Cyborg Spider-Man's Earth-2818. Karn is unaffected by their weapons, and they escape when Karn's brother and sister Brix and Bora arrive. Karn goes into another multiverse to kill an alternate Ai Apaec.

Morlun travels to Earth-31411 and encounters Aaron Aikman. He then goes to Earth-51412, where he absorbs Patton Parnell's life force. Morlun kills the local Spider-Man and his teammates Iceman and Firestar on Earth-1983. On Earth-999, Bora and Brix kill Spider-Cat. Daemos kills Spider-Man and several animalistic inhabitants of Counter-Earth on Earth-7891.

Daemos arrives in Eastern Europe to target Kaine Parker, and Old Man Spider-Man, Spider-Man of Earth-70105, and Spider-Woman of Earth-65 appear. He breaks the spine of Spider-Man of Earth-70105, and the others escape through a portal. Verna takes her Hounds Sable, Fireheart, and Kravinoff, Puma, and Kraven the Hunter out to hunt, and Morlun is furious that Daemos was hunting on Earth-616. Solus reminds them that he knows where the Bride, the Other, and the Scion are, and about a prophecy which will doom the Inheritors. Morlun says that he wants to be his father's chosen heir; the Great Web is his legacy and obligation. Solus says that the Web is all things and everywhere, and their kingdom makes them inheritors of all creation.

Spider-Man arrives on Earth-928 and finds Superior Spider-Man in charge. Old Man Spider-Man tells him about the prophecy targeting the Bride, the Other, and the Scion. When Daemos arrives and kills Spider-Cyborg, Superior Spider-Man kills Daemos but he regenerates. As the Spider-Men escape to Earth-13, Spider-Man is told by the dying Old Man Spider-Man to protect the totems.

On Earth-13989, Karn kills a werewolf version of Spider-Man. Solus has the Master Weaver send him to a more challenging world. When Morlun and Jennix arrive on Earth-13, they kill Spider-Monkey and a variation of Captain Spider. As Solus kills Cosmic Spider-Man, Morlun makes off with Benjy Parker.

Ben Reilly of Earth-94, Kaine, and Black Widow of Earth-1610 run into this world's version of Tony Stark and overpower him. As Jennix regenerates on Earth-802 and refuses to return to battle, Black Widow of Earth-1610, Ben Reilly of Earth-94, and Kaine move on his headquarters in the Baxter Building. Solus kills Arachnosaurus and Prince of Arachne and destroys Takuya Yamashiro's Leopardon. On Earth-3145, Silk arrives as Brix and Bora cannot enter this world. As the Spider-Army moves across dimensions, Jennix monitors them. On Earth-001, Morlun gives Benjy to Brix and Bora.

On Earth-802, Jennix reveals that he cloned spiders to help feed his family. As Ben Reilly prepares to sacrifice himself to destroy the lab, Kaine steals Black Widow of Earth-1610's teleporter to confront the Inheritors.

Six-Arm Spider-Man, Spider-Man 2099, and Lady Spider of Earth-803 travel to 2099 to dissect the clone body of Daemos for clues about how to defeat his brethren. Followed to the future by a new Daemos, Six Arm Spider-Man creates a distraction, but is killed before Miguel traps Daemos. Daemos kills himself so another clone can be activated. Miguel enlists the help of the Earth-928 Punisher to hold him off until Spider-Man 2099 and Lady Spider can transport back to Earth-13

Karn comes to Earth-3123 to kill the spider-totem of the reality where Aunt May was bitten by a radioactive spider and became Spider-Ma'am. She surrenders herself to keep her husband and nephew from harm. Karn is turned by Spider-Girl, Spider-UK, Spider-Punk, Spider-Man: India, and Spider-Woman of Earth-807128 against the Inheritors. After Black Widow of Earth-1610 and Kaine destroy the cloning facility on Earth-802, the Inheritors attack; Kaine arrives on Earth-001, transforms into a spider and impales Solus.

The Spider-Men overpower the Inheritors with Karn's help. Morlun tries to attack Peter Parker of Earth-616, Peter teleports him to Earth-3145 and is rescued by Silk. Following the Master Weaver's death, Karn takes his place as the Master Weaver. It was revealed as well that the Master Weaver was none other than Karn's future self. When asked about if Morlun and the Inheritors would survive without Spider-Totems, he says that they are feeding on mutated spiders.

Spider-Geddon
The Spider-Men and Master Weaver have been watching Earth-3145. Although the Inheritors are undernourished from a lack of spiders, they are collecting the heads of the Spider-Bots. Spider-UK and Master Weaver learn about an Inheritor cloning engine on Earth-616. On Earth-3145, Jennix harvests the Spider-Bots' transmitters. Spider-UK advises Master Weaver to call the Web Warriors.

Jennix, Morlun, and Verna emerge from Superior Octopus' cloning machine and Spider-Man Noir and Spider-UK are their first victims. Jennix tells Morlun that his score with the Earth-616 version of Spider-Man is irrelevant.

As Jennix works to regenerate the rest of the Inheritors, the spiders suggest that Superior Octopus trigger the base's self-destruction while Spider-Gwen with her symbiote distracts them. The Inheritors are free, restricted to their current bodies. Verna searches for the crystal containing Solus' life-force. She takes Brix, Bora, and Daemos with her while Jennix rebuilds the cloning tubes. Superior Octopus and Spider-Punk suggest killing the Inheritors. Karn is confronted by Verna for siding with the Web Warriors. After he stabs her, she still feeds on him.

Solus' body is restored as Daemos, Brix, Bora, and Jennix await for Verna's return with the crystal. Spider-Ham reports back to the group. They are attacked by Brix, Bora, and Daemos. During the retreat, Superior Spider-Man learns that Jennix is having trouble with New U Technologies' cloning technology.

After having located Peter Parker, Morlun proceeded to chase him throughout Manhattan where Morlun managed to wound him by breaking his wrist and his Dimensional Teleportation Watch. Before Morlun can finish of Spider-Man, Miles Morales shows up with some Spider-Men in order to provide some distractions which frustrated Morlun. When Morlun is brought down after a fierce fight with Spider-Man, he is trapped in a cage and hit with sedatives fired by Spider-Man and the police.

Using a Dimensional Teleportation Watch, Verna travels to Earth-3145 where they were previously trapped in order to find the crystal with Solus' life force. She and her Hounds would engage Spider-Woman, Astro-Spider of Earth-3145, Spider-Kid of Earth-218, Spider-Woman of Earth-807128, and Kaine Parker. Before being left to die on the radiation-filled Earth, Verna uses her teleportation watch on Spider-Woman as she planned to have her be sent to the rest of the Inheritors.

Spider-Woman returns to Earth-616 where she has the crystal with Solus' life force. At New U Technologies, Jennix grabs her and tells Daemos to share his food with Brix and Bora. As Daemos begins feeding on Spider-Woman, she says that she got her powers from a radiation blast. Jennix tells Daemos to place Spider-Woman in stasis so he can study her later. He puts the crystal in the cloning machine, reviving Solus, who plans to reward his children with a feast. Superior Spider-Man knocks out Ben Reilly and gives him to them as part of a deal which includes Solus sparing Earth-616. As Superior Spider-Man leaves, the Inheritors close in on the unconscious Ben Reilly.

Jennix starts to feed on Ben Reilly's life force and learns from him like his sacrifice in the battle against Green Goblin where Ben saved Spider-Man, Jackal recreating him, and how the cloning banks at New U Technologies work. These memories start to affect Jennix. As Spider-Man of Earth-1048 learns that this was part of Superior Spider-Man's plans, they are attacked by the Inheritors. Daemos attacks, but Solus tells him to stand aside because he has not fed on a spider yet. Solus is then shot in the back by Miles Morales, who was transformed into Captain Universe by the Enigma Force as Spider-Punk says that Jennix is insane and Verna is missing. The Captain Universe-powered Miles attacks, vowing not to make the same mistake as the Spider-Man of Earth-13. Leopardon shows up at New U Technologies and Takuya Yamashiro has it transformed until Daemos attacks. Superior Spider-Man and Octavia Otto free Spider-Woman, who says that Verna died on Earth-3145. As Superior Spider-Man and Octavia Otto revive Ben Reilly, the other spider-powered groups fight the Inheritors. Spiderling of Earth-18199 arrives with Anya Corazon and Spider-Woman of Earth-925, and Spiderling says that she is a Pattern-Maker. The three Spider-Women use the Web of Life and Destiny fragments to take down Brix and Bora, while Spider-Woman of Earth-925 fights Daemos. Spider-Gwen arrives with more spider-powered characters – including Spider-Man who defeated Morlun. Spider-Man catches up to Superior Spider-Man and Octavia Otto, who have restored Ben Reilly to "factory settings." Spider-Man allows Superior Spider-Man to formulate a plan as the Captain Universe-powered Miles uses Leopardon's sword on Solus, Brix, Bora, and Daemos. Superior Spider-Man tells the others that he revived the Inheritors as babies because Spider-Man arranged for the same thing to be done to Morlun. Spider-Ma'am states that her family will foster the baby Inheritors.

End of the Spider-Verse
After the totemic wasp-goddess Shathra had been freed once more, she eventually corrupted Spider-Ma'am and killed all baby Inheritors, leaving Morlun the only Inheritor alive.

Members
 Solus – The patriarch.
 Unnamed Matriarch – Solus' wife who died during the mission to capture the Master Weaver.
 Morlun – Solus' favorite who caused the temporary death of Spider-Man.
 Bora and Brix – Twins who compete with each other.
 Daemos – Solus' eldest son.
 Jennix – The brains of the family whose experiments are on Earth-802.
 Karn – The outcast and youngest son who was his mother's favorite. He abandons the family, becomes the Master Weaver, and is killed by Verna.
 Verna – Owner of the Hounds.

In other media

Video games
 The Inheritors appear in Spider-Man Unlimited with Morlun voiced by Travis Willingham, Solus voiced by Kyle Hebert, Daemos and Jennix voiced by Neil Kaplan, and Karn voiced by Matthew Mercer. 
 Karn and Morlun appeared as boss villains in two Spec-Ops missions of the Facebook game Marvel: Avengers Alliance.

Novels
In the Jim Butcher novel Spider-Man: The Darkest Hours, a previous version of the Inheritors called the Ancients (consisting of Thanis, Mortia, and Malos) appear and seek revenge on Spider-Man after Morlun's first death. They are defeated by Spider-Man with additional aid from Black Cat and the Rhino, culminating in Mary Jane Watson driving her car into the last Ancient standing. Once all three have been rendered unconscious, the Ancients are banished to another dimension by Spider-Man using three mystical objects given to him by Doctor Strange.

Reception
In June 2018, Comic Book Resources ranked the Inheritors its fourteenth choice of supervillains for a subsequent Marvel Cinematic Universe.

References

External links
 
 Solus at Marvel Wiki
 Bora at Marvel Wiki
 Brix at Marvel Wiki
 Daemos at Marvel Wiki
 Jennix at Marvel Wiki
 Karn at Marvel Wiki
 Morlun at Marvel Wiki
 Verna at Marvel Wiki
 Inheritors at Comic Vine
 Inheritors at Spider-Man Wiki

Marvel Comics supervillain teams
2014 comics debuts
Fictional dictators
Fictional mass murderers
Fictional families
Fictional characters from parallel universes
Marvel Comics characters with superhuman strength
Marvel Comics vampires
Fictional characters with slowed ageing
Fictional cannibals
Fictional characters with superhuman senses
Fictional characters with immortality
Fictional hunters